Heide Simonis (born 4 July 1943 in Bonn as Heide Steinhardt) is a German Author and Politician. She is a member of the SPD. From 1993 to 2005 she served as the Minister-President of Schleswig-Holstein. She was the first woman to serve as head of a state government in German history and the only woman to do so in the 20th century.

Personal Life and Education
Simonis earned her high school degree (Abitur) in 1962 in Nürnberg. She then studied Economics and Sociology at the Universities of Erlangen-Nürnberg and Kiel, graduating with a degree in economics in 1967. She worked in different positions after 1967.

Simonis is married to university professor Udo Simonis.

Career

Simonis joined the SPD in 1969. She was elected to the German Bundestag in 1976. In 1992, she became a member of the legislature of Schleswig-Holstein. On 19 May 1993, she was elected Minister-President of said state, after her predecessor Björn Engholm resigned from that position due to a scandal. She was the first woman in Germany to rise to this level in politics.

The state election in 1996 saw the SPD drop down to 39.8% (from 46.2% in 1992), but Simonis was able to form a coalition with the Greens. In February 2000, at the height of a CDU party financing scandal, the SPD was able to enlarge its share to 43.1%. Despite basing its 2005 election campaign on Simonis' popularity, the SPD suffered a heavy defeat due to the bad economic situation and dropped down to 38.7% (for the first time in almost twenty years behind the CDU).

On 17 March 2005 Simonis failed to be re-elected as Minister-President of Schleswig-Holstein in 4 consecutive ballots by the Schleswig-Holstein Landtag. In the 1st ballot she received 34 votes and Peter Harry Carstensen (CDU) received 33 while 2 deputies cast empty votes. Neither Simonis nor Carstensen got the absolute majority (35 votes).  In the 2nd and 3rd ballot the candidates received 34 votes each. Obviously one deputy of the alliance of SPD, Grüne (Greens) and SSW abstained. An unprecedented 4th ballot brought the same result and Simonis has since stepped down as Minister-President of Schleswig-Holstein.

UNICEF
From 2005 until February 2008 Simonis served as Chief of the German UNICEF. She resigned from this position due to a scandal related to donations to the organisation that arose during her term.

See also
List of Minister-Presidents of Schleswig-Holstein

References

1943 births
Living people
Politicians from Bonn
Members of the Bundestag for Schleswig-Holstein
Members of the Landtag of Schleswig-Holstein
People from the Rhine Province
Female members of the Bundestag
Recipients of the Order of the Cross of Terra Mariana, 2nd Class
Ministers-President of Schleswig-Holstein
Ministers of the Schleswig-Holstein State Government
20th-century German women politicians
21st-century German women politicians
Members of the Bundestag for the Social Democratic Party of Germany
Women Ministers-President in Germany